Robert Peabody may refer to:

 Robert Swain Peabody (1845–1917), Boston architect
 Robert J. Peabody (born 1956), president and CEO of Husky Energy Inc.